Markus Deibler (born 28 January 1990) is a German swimmer who competed at the 2008 and 2012 Olympics. In 2008 he finished in 40th place in the 200 m individual medley. In 2012 he was sixth in the 4 × 100 m freestyle and 4 × 100 m medley relays and eighth in the 200 m medley. He won three gold and two silver medals at the short-course European championships in 2010 and 2011.

His elder brother Steffen also competed in swimming at the 2008 and 2012 Olympics.

References

1990 births
Living people
People from Biberach an der Riss
Sportspeople from Tübingen (region)
German male swimmers
Male medley swimmers
Olympic swimmers of Germany
Swimmers at the 2008 Summer Olympics
Swimmers at the 2012 Summer Olympics
Medalists at the FINA World Swimming Championships (25 m)
World record holders in swimming
20th-century German people
21st-century German people